Welker Marçal de Almeida (born 24 September 1986), commonly known as Kieza, is a Brazilian professional footballer who plays for Náutico as a striker.

Career
Born in Vitória, he was signed on February 20, 2010 by Cruzeiro Esporte Clube who ended his contract in January 2010 with Fluminense.

In 2011, Kieza moved from Cruzeiro to Campeonato Brasileiro Série B side Náutico on a season-long loan deal. He helped Náutico being promoted to the Série A, scoring 21 goals in the season which allowed him to become Top goalscorer of this tournament.

Botafogo
In April 2019, he joined Fortaleza on loan.

Honours 
Bahia
 Campeonato Baiano: 2015

Vitória
 Campeonato Baiano: 2016, 2017

Botafogo
 Campeonato Carioca: 2018

Náutico
Campeonato Pernambucano: 2021

References

External links

1986 births
Living people
People from Vitória, Espírito Santo
Brazilian footballers
Association football forwards
Campeonato Brasileiro Série A players
Campeonato Brasileiro Série B players
Desportiva Ferroviária players
Americano Futebol Clube players
Fluminense FC players
Cruzeiro Esporte Clube players
Associação Atlética Ponte Preta players
Clube Náutico Capibaribe players
Esporte Clube Bahia players
São Paulo FC players
Esporte Clube Vitória players
Botafogo de Futebol e Regatas players
Fortaleza Esporte Clube players
UAE Pro League players
Al Shabab Al Arabi Club Dubai players
Chinese Super League players
Shanghai Shenxin F.C. players
Brazilian expatriate footballers
Brazilian expatriate sportspeople in the United Arab Emirates
Brazilian expatriate sportspeople in China
Expatriate footballers in the United Arab Emirates
Expatriate footballers in China
Sportspeople from Espírito Santo